Wynford may refer to:

Baron Wynford, of Wynford Eagle in the County of Dorset, is a title in the Peerage of the United Kingdom
Thomas Wynford Rees CB, CIE, DSO & Bar, MC, DL (1898–1959), officer in the British Indian Army
William Best, 1st Baron Wynford, PC (1767–1845), British politician and judge
William Best, 2nd Baron Wynford (1798–1869), British peer
William Wynford (1360–1405), one of the most successful English master masons of the 14th century, using the new Perpendicular Gothic style
Wynford Dewhurst (born 1864), English Impressionist painter and important writer on art
Wynford Eagle, hamlet and small parish in Dorset, England
Wynford High School, public high school in Bucyrus, Ohio, United States
Wynford Vaughan-Thomas CBE (1908–1987), Welsh newspaper journalist and radio and television broadcaster with a lengthy career